Series 25 of University Challenge ran between 1 November 1995 and 1 May 1996.

Results
 Winning teams are highlighted in bold.
 Teams with green scores (winners) returned in the next round, while those with red scores (losers) were eliminated.
 Teams with orange scores have lost, but survived as highest scoring losers.
 A score in italics indicates a match decided on a tie-breaker question.

First round

Second round

Quarter-finals

Semi-finals

Final

 The trophy and title were awarded to the Imperial team comprising Jim Totty, Nick Bradshaw, Mark Pallen and Chris Harrison.
 The trophy was presented by John Simpson.

References

External links
 University Challenge Homepage
 Blanchflower Results Table

1995
1995 British television seasons
1996 British television seasons